Steam distillation is a separation process that consists in distilling water together with other volatile and non-volatile components.  The steam from the boiling water carries the vapor of the volatiles to a condenser; both are cooled and return to the liquid or solid state, while the non-volatile residues remain behind in the boiling container.  

If, as is usually the case, the volatiles are not miscible with water, they will spontaneously form a distinct phase after condensation, allowing them to be separated by decantation or with a separatory funnel. 

Steam distillation can be used when the boiling point of the substance to be extracted is higher than that of water, and the starting material cannot be heated to that temperature because of decomposition or other unwanted reactions.   It may also be useful when the amount of the desired substance is small compared to that of the non-volatile residues.  It is often used to separate volatile essential oils from plant material. for example, to extract limonene (boiling point 176 °C) from orange peels.  

Steam distillation once was a popular laboratory method for purification of organic compounds, but it has been replaced in many such uses by vacuum distillation and supercritical fluid extraction.  It is however much simpler and economical than those alternatives, and remains important in certain industrial sectors.

In the simplest form, water distillation or hydrodistillation, the water is mixed with the starting material in the boiling container.  In direct steam distillation, the starting material is suspended above the water in the boiling flask, supported by a metal mesh or perforated screen.  In dry steam distillation, the steam from a boiler is forced to flow through the starting material in a separate container. The latter variant allows the steam to be heated above the boiling point of water (thus becoming superheated steam), for more efficient extraction.

History 

Steam distillation was also used by the Persian philosopher and physician Avicenna (980–1037) to produce essential oils by adding water to rose petals and distilling the mixture. The process was also used by al-Dimashqi (1256–1327) to produce rose water on a large scale.

Principle
Every substance has some vapor pressure even below its boiling point, so in theory it could be distilled at any temperature by collecting and condensing its vapors.  However, ordinary distillation below the boiling point is not practical because a layer of vapor-rich air would form over the liquid, and evaporation would stop as soon as the partial pressure of the vapor in that layer reached the vapor pressure.  The vapor would then flow to the condenser only by diffusion, which is an extremely slow process.

Simple distillation is generally done by boiling the starting material, because, once its vapor pressure exceeds atmospheric pressure, that still vapor-rich layer of air will be disrupted, and there will be a significant and steady flow of vapor from the boiling flask to the condenser.  

In steam distillation, that positive flow is provided by steam from boiling water, rather than by the boiling of the substances of interest.  The steam carries with it the vapors of the latter.

The substance of interest does not need to be miscible water or soluble in it. It suffices that it has significant vapor pressure at the steam's temperature.

If the water forms an azeotrope with the substances of interest, the boiling point of the mixture may be lower than the boiling point of water.  For example, bromobenzene boils at 156 °C (at normal atmospheric pressure), but a mixture with water boils at 95 °C. However, the formation of an azeotrope is not necessary for steam distillation to work.

Applications 

Steam distillation is often employed in the isolation of essential oils, for use in perfumes, for example. In this method, steam is passed through the plant material containing the desired oils. Eucalyptus oil, camphor oil and orange oil are obtained by this method on an industrial scale. Steam distillation is a means of purifying fatty acids, e.g. from tall oils.

Steam distillation is sometimes used in the chemical laboratory. Illustrative is a classic preparation of bromobiphenyl where steam distillation is used to first remove the excess benzene and subsequently to purifiy the bominated product.  In one preparation of benzophenone, steam is employed to first recover unreacted carbon tetrachloride and subsequently to hydrolyze the intermediate benzophenone dichloride into benzophenone, which is in fact not steam distilled.  It one preparation of a purine, steam distillation is used to remove volatile benzaldehyde from nonvolatile product.

Equipment 

On a lab scale, steam distillations are carried out using steam generated outside the system and piped through the mixture to be purified.  Steam can also be generated in-situ using a Clevenger-type apparatus.

See also
 Azeotropic distillation
 Batch distillation
 Distillation
 Extractive distillation
 Fractional distillation
 Heteroazeotrope
 Herbal distillates
 Hydrodistillation
 Laboratory equipment
 Steam engine
 Steam stripping
 Supercritical fluid extraction
 Theoretical plate

References

Distillation